Fromia is a genus of starfish belonging to the family Goniasteridae.

Description 
These species are tropical sea stars, with 5 arms but sometimes up to 7. Some species like Fromia monilis or Fromia nodosa can be very difficult to identify, as they look like each other a lot, and even like unrelated species as those of the genus Paraferdinia.

Species

Bibliography 
 Christopher Mah, "Overview of the Ferdina-like Goniasteridae (Echinodermata: Asteroidea) including a new subfamily, three new genera and fourteen new species", Zootaxa, vol. 4271, 2017
 Sprung, Julian y Delbeek, J.Charles- The Reef Aquarium. Volume two - Ricordea Publishing
 Debelius, Helmut y Baensch, Hans A - Atlas Marino - Mergus
 Gosliner, Beherens y Williams. Coral Reef Animals of the Indo-Pacific. Sea Challenger
 Debelius, Helmut. Guía de especies del arrecife Pacífico-Asiático. M&G Difusión. 2001
 Lieske, Ewald & Myers, Robert. Coral Reef Guide: Red Sea. HarperCollins Publishers. 2004.

References

External links

Notes